Gajapati is a village located in Belgaum district, in the southern state of Karnataka, India.

Demographics
 Census of India, the village had a population of 1633 with a literacy rate of 74.07%.

References

Villages in Belagavi district